This List of musicians from Seattle recognizes artists that are either from, or significantly associated with, the city.

 10 Minute Warning, hardcore punk band
 3rd Secret, alternative rock/folk rock/grunge band 
 7 Horns 7 Eyes, Christian melodic death metal band 
 7 Year Bitch, riot grrrl band
 764-HERO, indie rock/emo band 
 A Frames, experimental rock band
 Aaron Parks, jazz pianist 
 Aaron Sprinkle, alternative rock multi-instrumenralist & producer
 Abney Park, steampunk band
 Abyssinian Creole, Northwest hip hop duo 
 Acceptance, pop-punk band
 The Accused, crossover thrash band
 Aiden, horror punk band
 Akimbo, hardcore punk band 
 Alcohol Funnycar, alternative rock/post-grunge band 
 Alex Vincent, grunge/punk rock drummer
 Alice in Chains, grunge band
 Alice N' Chains, glam metal band
 Allen Stone, blue-eyed soul singer-songwriter 
 Alyse Black, rock/pop/jazz/folk pop singer-songwriter 
 Amber Pacific, pop-punk band
 Amy Denio, avant-garde jazz/experimental rock/free improvisation multi-instrumenralist/vocalist 
 Andrew Wood, grunge/glam metal vocalist 
 Ann Wilson, hard rock/pop rock vocalist 
 Anomie Belle, avant-garde vocalist/multi-instrumentalist
 Aqueduct, indie pop band 
 Artis the Spoonman, rock spoonist/busker
 Arthur & Yu, indie folk duo 
 Assemblage 23, futurepop band 
 Asva, drone/doom metal band 
 Awaken the Empire, alternative rock/metal band 
 "Awesome", cabaret collective
 Ayron Jones, blues rock vocalist/guitarist 
 Baby Gramps, Americana singer-songwriter 
 Band of Horses, indie rock band 
 Barcelona, indie rock band 
 Barrett Martin, grunge percussionist & ethnomusicologist
 The Beakers, art punk/post-punk/new wave band 
 Bell Witch, doom metal band 
 Ben Bridwell, indie rock vocalist/guitarist 
 Ben Gibbard, indie rock vocalist/guitarist 
 Ben Shepherd, grunge bassist 
 The Bergevin Brothers, political jazz band
 Bernadette Bascom, R&B/gospel vocalist 
 Best Kissers in the World, post-grunge band 
 Big Band Garage Orchestra, punk jazz orchestra 
 Big Business, heavy metal band 
 Bill Frisell, jazz guitarist 
 Bill Rieflin, industrial rock drummer 
 Black Cat Orchestra, classical/world/film score band 
 The Blackouts, punk rock band
 Blaine "Zippy" Cook, punk rock/thrash metal vocalist 
 Blake Lewis, beatboxer/pop vocalist 
 Blake Wescott, indie rock guitarist/drummer 
 The Blakes, indie rock band 
 The Blood Brothers, post-hardcore band 
 Blood Circus, sludge metal band 
 Bloodgood, Christian metal band 
 Blue Scholars, Northwest  hip hop/alternative hip hop duo
 BOAT, indie rock band 
 Bonnie Guitar, country/pop singer-songwriter/guitarist 
 Botch, mathcore band 
 Brad, alternative rock band 
 Brandi Carlile, Americana singer-songwriter 
 Brent Amaker and the Rodeo, country band
 Briana Marela, indie rock vocalist 
 The Briefs, punk rock band 
 Brite Futures (formerly Natalie Portman's Shaved Head), indie rock/electronica band 
 The Brothers Four, folk pop vocal group 
 Bruce Fairweather, grunge guitarist/bassist 
 Buddy Catlett, jazz bassist 
 Budo, hip hop multi-instrumenralist/producer 
 Bundle of Hiss, grunge band 
 Burning Witch, doom metal band 
 Calm Down Juanita, psychedelic rock band 
 Candlebox, grunge/post-grunge band 
 Car Seat Headrest, indie rock band 
 Cardiknox, indie pop band 
 Carissa's Wierd, indie rock band 
 Carrie Akre, alternative rock vocalist 
 Cat Butt, alternative rock band 
 The Catch, alternative pop band 
 The Catheters, hard rock band 
 The Cave Singers, indie rock/folk band 
 Chad Channing, alternative rock drummer 
 Champion, hardcore punk band 
 charlieonnafriday, melodic rapper
 Chastity Belt, alternative rock band 
 Childbirth, garage rock band
 Chinas Comidas, art punk band 
 Choral Arts, choral music group 
 Chris Ballew aka Caspar Babypants, alternative rock/kids' music vocalist/bassist/basitarist
 Chris Cornell, grunge/hard rock vocalist 
 Chris Staples, alternative rock multi-instrumenralist 
 Chris Walla, indie rock singer-songwriter/guitarist 
 Christ Analogue, electronic/industrial rock band 
 Christian Wargo, indie folk singer-songwriter/guitarist 
 Circus Contraption, dark cabaret troupe
 Clarence Acox Jr., jazz drummer & director of the Garfield Jazz Ensemble (1979–2019)
 The Classic Crime, alternative rock band 
 Climax Golden Twins, experimental music band 
 Cody Votolato, post-hardcore guitarist 
 Coffin Break, hardcore punk band
 Common Market, Northwest hip hop duo
 Critters Buggin, jazz/rock/funk/electronica instrumental band 
 Culprit, heavy metal band 
 Cuong Vu, jazz trumpet 
 Daily Flash, folk rock/psychedelic rock band 
 Damien Jurado, indie rock singer-songwriter 
 Dan Hoerner, emo vocalist/guitarist 
 Dan Peters, grunge drummer 
 Daniel House, grunge bassist & former owner of C/Z Records
 Dann Gallucci, indie rock guitarist/producer 
 The Dark Fantastic, hard/desert/psychedelic/indie rock band 
 Dark Time Sunshine, alternative/indie hip hop duo 
 Dave Dederer, alternative rock vocalist/guitarist/guitbassist 
 Dave Knudson, indie rock/mathcore guitarist 
 Dave Krusen, alternative rock drummer 
 Dave Lewis, R&B vocalist/keyboardist 
 David Bazan,  indie rock singer-songwriter/multi-instrumentalist 
 David Friesen, jazz bassist 
 David Zaffiro, Christian metal guitarist & producer 
  David Wayne,  heavy metal vocalist 
 Dead Low Tide, garage rock band 
 The Dead Science, experimental pop band 
 Dear John Letters, alternative rock/indie rock/emo band 
 Death Cab For Cutie, indie rock band 
 Deep Sea Diver, pop rock band 
 Demon Hunter,  Christian metal band 
 Devilhead, alternative rock band
 Diagram of Suburban Chaos, electronic music composer 
 Dick Wilson, jazz tenor saxophonist 
 Dickless, riot grrrl/grunge/punk rock/funk punk band 
 The Divorce, indie rock band 
 Doll Squad, alternative rock/power pop band 
 Dolour, indie rock band 
 Don Lanphere, jazz saxophonist 
 Dude York, alternative rock band 
 Duff McKagan, hard rock bassist
 Dust Moth, metalgaze band 
 The Dutchess and the Duke, indie folk band
 Eddie Vedder, grunge vocalist 
 Eldon Hoke aka El Duce, shock rock vocalist/drummer 
 Elmer Gill, jazz pianist/vibraphonist/vocalist 
 Emi Meyer, jazz vocalist/pianist 
 Eric Carlson aka Sickie Wifebeater, shock rock guitarist 
 Erik Blood, hip hop artist/producer
 Ernestine Anderson, vocal jazz/blues vocalist 
 Estradasphere, experimental rock band 
 Fair, alternative rock/emo pop band 
 Faith & Disease, ethereal wave/dark wave/slowcore/shoegaze/dream pop/new-age band 
 The Fall of Troy, mathcore band 
 The Fartz, hardcore punk band 
 Fastbacks, punk rock band 
 Fences, pop rock band 
 Fifth Angel, heavy metal band 
 The Fire Theft, prog rock band 
 Fleet Foxes, indie folk band 
 Flop, power pop band 
 Floyd Standifer, jazz tenor saxophonist/trumpeter
 Foo Fighters, post-grunge band 
 Forced Entry, thrash metal band 
 Forgive Durden, indie rock/emo band 
 Frank Waldron, jazz cornetist/trumpeter/alto saxophonist 
 The Frantics, garage rock band 
 Gabor Hun, punk rock guitarist/vocalist 
 Gabriel Teodros, Northwest hip hop rapper 
 The Gallahads, doo wop vocal group 
 Gary Lee Conner, grunge guitarist 
 Gas Huffer, garage rock band 
 Gatsbys American Dream,  indie rock band 
 The Gentlemen, pop rock band 
 Geoff Reading, hard rock drummer 
 Gerald Brashear, jazz 
conga drummer/saxophonist/scat singer
 Girl On Fire, hard rock band 
 The Girls, pop punk band 
 The Gits, punk rock band 
 Goodness, alternative rock band 
 Gosling (formerly Loudermilk), hard rock band 
 Grammatrain, post-punk band 
 Grand Archives, indie rock band 
 Grand Hallway, chamber pop
 Grave Babies, goth rock band 
 Grayskul, Northwest hip hop/alternative hip hop duo
 Green Apple Quick Step, post-grunge/psychedelic rock band 
 The Green Pajamas, neo-psychedelia band 
 Green River, grunge band 
 Greg Anderson, doom metal guitarist 
 Greg Gilmore, grunge drummer 
 Grieves, hip hop rapper/producer
 Gruntruck, grunge band 
 Guy Lacey, grunge guitarist/vocalist 
 Hadley Caliman, jazz saxophonist/flutist 
 Hammerbox, grunge band 
 Harold Weeks, jazz/ragtime composer/songwriter 
 Harvey Danger, alternative rock band 
 Hater, alternative metal band 
 He Is We, indie pop band 
 The Head and the Heart, indie folk band 
 Headphones, indie rock/synthpop band 
 Heart, hard rock/pop rock band
 Heir Apparent, heavy metal band 
 Heiress, sludge metal band 
 Hell's Belles, all-girl AC/DC tribute band
 Helms Alee, sludge metal band 
 Hey Marseilles, indie folk/chamber pop band 
 Hibou, dream pop band 
 Himsa, metalcore band 
 Hiro Yamamoto, grunge bassist 
 Hobosexual, experimental rock band 
 Hollis, pop/hip hop singer-songwriter 
 Howard Leese, hard rock guitarist 
 Hovercraft, experimental rock instrumental band 
 I Declare War, deathcore band 
 The Intelligence, post-punk band 
 Isaac Brock, indie rock vocalist/guitarist 
 Isaac Scott, blues/soul/gospel guitarist/vocalist 
 Ivan & Alyosha, indie pop band 
 Ivar Haglund, folk singer and founder of Ivar's Acres of Clams
 J. Clark  post-punk guitarist/drummer 
 Jack Endino, grunge guitarist & Sub Pop producer/engineer 
 Jake Snider, indie rock guitarist/vocalist 
 Jake One, Northwest hip hop/trap producer/songwriter 
 James Bergstrom, hard rock drummer 
 Jason Finn, alternative rock drummer 
 Jason Holstrom, electronic rock/dream pop guitarist/vocalist 
 Jason Kardong, Americana/lo-fi/alt-country pedal steel guitarist/vocalist 
 Jason Webley, folk punk vocalist/accordionist/guitarist 
 Jay Park, hip hop/R&B rapper/singer-songwriter
 Jeff Ament, grunge bassist 
 Jeff Angell, blues rock vocalist/guitarist 
 Jeff Kashiwa, jazz fusion saxophonist 
 Jeff Loomis, prog rock guitarist 
 Jeff Rouse, hard rock bassist 
 Jeff Suffering, Christian punk vocalist/bassist
 Jen Wood, alternative rock vocalist/guitarist 
 Jennifer Thomas, crossover/classical/new-age pianist
 Jeremiah Green, indie rock drummer 
 Jeremy Enigk, emo/prog rock vocalist/guitarist 
 Jerry Cantrell, grunge guitarist/vocalist 
 Jesse Brand, country rock singer-songwriter/multi-instrumentalist 
 Jessica Lurie, jazz woodwinds
 Jim Allchin, blues rock guitarist/vocalist & Microsoft software engineer 
 Jim Black, free jazz/post-rock drummer 
 Jim Page, folk singer-songwriter/busker
 Jim Sheppard, prog rock bassist 
 Jimi Hendrix, psychedelic rock/blues rock guitarist/vocalist 
 Joe Doria, jazz/funk/rock Hammond organist
 John Holte, big band swing bandleader/arranger/reedist
 John Pettibone, hardcore punk/metalcore vocalist 
 John Roderick, indie rock singer-songwriter/guitarist 
 Johnny Bacolas, glam metal/industrial dance/world music bassist 
 Johnny Whitney, post-hardcore vocalist/keyboardist 
 Jon Auer, power pop/psychedelic rock guitarist 
 Jonathan Moore aka Wordsayer, Northwest hip hop  producer/rapper/DJ
 Jordan Blilie, post-hardcore vocalist 
 Julian Priester, jazz trombonist & educator (Cornish College of the Arts 1979–2011)
 Juned, pop rock band 
 Juno, post-punk band 
 Kay Kay and His Weathered Underground, psychedelic pop band 
 Kenny G, smooth jazz saxophonist 
 Ken Stringfellow, alternative rock guitarist/vocalist 
 Ken Mary, heavy metal drummer 
 Kevin Wood, grunge guitarist 
 Kevtone, alternative rock drummer 
 Khingz, Northwest hip hop MC
 Kid Sensation (now known as Xola Malik), old skool hip hop rapper/producer 
 Kill Switch...Klick, industrial rock band
 Kim Thayil, grunge guitarist 
 Kim Warnick, punk rock vocalist/bassist 
 Kings Kaleidoscope, contemporary worship/Christian rock/art rock/chamber pop/progressive pop band
 Kinski, post-rock band 
 Kiss It Goodbye, metalcore/hardcore punk band 
 Krist Novoselic, grunge bassist 
 Kultur Shock, Gypsy punk/alternative metal band 
 Kurt Bloch, hard rock guitarist 
 Kurt Cobain, grunge vocalist/guitarist 
 Kyle Townsend, hip hop/R&B producer/keyboardist 
 La Luz, surf noir band 
 Land,   jazz/world music/electronica band 
 The Lashes, power pop band
 Lavender Country, country/Americana band 
 Layne Staley, grunge vocalist 
 Leah LaBelle, R&B vocalist
 Legion Within, dark wave/gothic rock/industrial rock band 
 The Lemons, post-grunge/pop punk band 
 Liar's Club, pop music band 
 Lil Mosey, hip hop/trap rapper 
 Limp Richerds, hardcore punk band 
 Little Champions, indie rock band 
 Living Daylights, jazz-jamband trio
 Loaded, hard rock band 
 The Long Winters, indie rock band 
 Loni Rose, pop music singer-songwriter 
 Love Battery, grunge band 
 The Lovemongers, acoustic side project of Ann & Nancy Wilson of Heart
 Macklemore, hip hop rapper 
 Mad Rad, hipster hop group 
 Mad Season, grunge band 
 The Magic Magicians, indie rock duo 
 Maktub, jazz fusion/prog rock band 
 The Maldives, alt-country band 
 Malfunkshun, glam punk/grunge band 
 Mamiffer, post-rock/ambient/experimental rock/drone 
 Manooghi Hi, prog rock band 
 Marc Seales, jazz/post-bop pianist 
 Mark Arm, grunge vocalist/guitarist 
 Mark Lanegan, grunge vocalist 
 Mark Pickerel, grunge drummer/guitarist/vocalist 
 Mary Lambert, R&B/folk/pop singer-songwriter & spoken word artist
 Mat Brooke, indie rock singer-songwriter/guitarist 
 Mateo Messina, classical/film score pianist/composer 
 Math and Physics Club, indie pop band 
 Matt Bayles, indie rock keyboardist & producer 
 Matt Lukin, grunge bassist 
 Melissa Reese, hard rock keyboardist/vocalist 
 Merrilee Rush,  pop vocalist 
 Mentors, shock rock band 
 Metal Church,  heavy metal band 
 Mia Zapata, punk rock vocalist 
 Michael "The Whip" Wilton, progressive metal guitarist 
 Mico de Noche, stoner rock/sludge metal band 
 Mike Inez, grunge/alternative metal bassist 
 Mike McCready, grunge guitarist 
 Mike Squires, alternative rock guitarist 
 Mike Starr, grunge bassist 
 Minus the Bear, math rock band 
 The Missionary Position, blues rock band 
 Mistrust, heavy metal band 
 Modest Mouse, indie rock band 
 Mother Love Bone, grunge/glam punk band 
 Mr. Hill, Northwest hip hop/alternative hip hop DJ & producer 
 Mt. St. Helens Vietnam Band, indie rock band 
 Mudhoney, grunge band 
 Murder City Devils, horror punk band 
 My Sister's Machine, grunge band 
 The Myriad, indie rock band 
 Nacho Picasso, hip hop rapper
 Naked Giants, rock and roll/psychedelic rock/grunge/post-punk/lo-fi band 
 Nancy Wilson, hard rock/pop rock guitarist/backing vocalist 
 Narrows, mathcore band 
 Natalie Grant, contemporary Christian vocalist 
 Nate Mendel, alternative rock bassist 
 Neko Case, indie rock/alt-country vocalist/tenor guitarist/percussionist 
 Neon Blonde, experimental rock band 
 Nerve Filter, electronic band 
 Nevada Bachelors, alternative rock band 
 Nevermore, heavy metal band 
 New American Shame, hard rock band 
 Nick Pollock, grunge guitarist/vocalist 
 Nick Wiggins, post-hardcore guitarist/bassist 
 Night Beats, garage rock band 
 Nightcaps, lounge band 
 Nirvana, grunge band 
 Nissim Black aka D.Black, hardcore/conscious/Jewish hip hop rapper/producer 
 The No WTO Combo, hardcore punk/spoken word band 
 Noah Gundersen and the Courage, acoustic folk rock singer-songwriter and his band 
 NoClue, Northwest hip hop rapper 
 Odesza, electropop duo 
 Oldominion, hip hop collective (which also has members from Portland, Oregon)
 On the Last Day, post-hardcore band 
 Onry Ozzborn, alternative hip hop rapper/producer 
 Orcas, dream pop/ambient/electronic duo
 Orkestar RTW, Balkan folk band 
 Owen Wright, grunge/heavy metal guitarist 
 Pacific Gold, contemporary Christian band 
 The Pale Pacific, power pop band 
 Pamela Moore, hard rock/heavy metal singer-songwriter 
 Past Lives, post-punk band 
 Patti Bown, jazz/soul pianist/vocalist 
 Paul Tutmarc, country tenor vocalist/lap steel guitarist 
 Pearl Jam, grunge band 
 Pedro The Lion, slowcore band 
 Perfume Genius, art pop singer-songwriter 
 Perkins Coie Band, rock and roll/garage rock band 
 Pete Stewart, Christian rock singer-songwriter 
 Peter Cornell, alternative metal/heavy metal/grunge/alternative rock/hard rock singer-songwriter/guitarist 
 Peter DePoe (aka Last Walking Bear), funk rock/swamp rock/soul/R&B/Native American traditional drummer 
 Peter Scott Lewis, contemporary classical composer
 Pickwick, garage rock band 
 Pigeonhed, trip hop/lo-fi band 
 PK Dwyer, jump blues busker
 Pleaseeasaur, camp musical parody act
 Pollens, indie rock band
 Ponga, jazz improv band 
 Pony Time, garage rock/punk rock band 
 Poor Moon, indie folk band 
 Poor Old Lu, Christian rock band 
 The Posies, power pop band 
 The Postal Service, indie pop/synth-pop band 
 Posse, indie rock band 
 Presidents of the United States of America, alternative rock band 
 Pretty Girls Make Graves, post-punk band 
 Pretty Mary Sunshine, indie rock band 
 The Prom, indie rock band 
 Psychic Emperor, electropop band 
 Q5, hard rock/heavy metal band 
 Quincy Jones, jazz trumpeter/arranger & multi-genre producer 
 RA Scion, Northwest hip hop/alternative hip hop rapper/producer 
 Raft of Dead Monkeys, Christian punk band 
 Rail, hard rock band 
 Randy Hansen, psychedelic rock/blues rock guitarist & Jimi Hendrix tribute performer 
 Ray Charles, R&B vocalist/pianist 
 Ray Dalton, hip hop/gospel/R&B/pop singer-songwriter 
 Raz Simone, hip hop rapper 
 Red Stars Theory, slowcore band 
 Regan Hagar, grunge drummer 
 Reggie Watts, comedic electronic/trip hop beatboxer/keyboardist & "disinformationist"
 Reignwolf, indie rock/blues rock band 
  Reverend, thrash metal band 
 The Revolutionary Hydra, indie rock band 
 Richard Stuverud, grunge drummer 
 Rick Parashar, grunge keyboardist & founder of London Bridge Studio
 Roadside Monument, math rock band 
 Robert "Bumps" Blackwell, jazz bandleader & multi-genre producer 
 Robert Cray, blues vocalist/guitarist 
 Robert DeLong, house/dubstep keyboardist/sampler
 Robert Brown aka Captain Robert, steampunk vocalist/multi-instrumentalist 
 Robert Roth, grunge/psychedelic rock vocalist/keyboardist/guitarist 
 Robin Pecknold, indie folk singer-songwriter 
 Robin Holcomb, avant-garde minimalist singer-songwriter/pianist 
 The Rockfords, alternative rock band 
 Rocky Votolato, indie folk/folk rock singer-songwriter 
 Roger Fisher, hard rock guitarist 
 Ron Holden, R&B/pop/rock and roll vocalist 
 Room Nine, psychedelic rock band 
 Rose Blossom Punch, post-grunge band 
 Rose Windows, psychedelic rock band 
 Rosie Thomas, indie folk singer-songwriter & comedian (as Sheila Saputa)
 Roxy Coss, jazz saxophonist 
 The Rumba Kings, world music band 
 Rusty Willoughby, power pop vocalist/guitarist/drummer 
 Ryan Lewis, alternative hip hop/hipster hop DJ/producer 
 Ryann Donnelly, horror punk/pop vocalist 
 S aka Jenn Champion (formerly Jenn Ghetto), indie rock singer-songwriter
 Sabzi, alternative hip hop DJ/producer 
 Sam Kim, R&B singer-songwriter/guitarist 
 Sammy Drain, blues/rock/R&B guitarist 
 Sanctuary, thrash metal band 
 Sandrider, grunge/sludge metal band 
 Sango, electronic/hip hop/R&B DJ/producer 
 Sanjaya Malakar, pop vocalist 
 Satchel, grunge band 
 Satisfact, post-punk band 
 The Saturday Knights, hip hop/indie rock/pop band 
 Say Hi, indie rock solo act
 The Scene Aesthetic, acoustic indie/folk/country pop band 
 Schoolyard Heroes, horror punk band 
 scntfc, EDM/hip hop/rock composer/sound designer
 Scott McCaughey, alternative rock guitarist 
 Scott Mercado, grunge/psychedelic rock drummer 
 Scott Rockenfield aka SRock, prog rock drummer 
 Screaming Trees, grunge band 
 Seapony, indie pop band 
 Sean Kinney, grunge drummer 
 Sean Nelson, alternative rock vocalist/keyboardist
 Sean Osborn, classical/chamber clarinetist/composer 
 Seattle Chamber Players, chamber ensemble
 Seattle Girls Choir, choral music group 
 Seattle Opera, Opera company
 Seattle Pro Musica, choral music group 
 Seattle Symphony, classical orchestra 
 Second Coming, industrial dance band 
 Sera Cahoone, Americana/lo-fi singer-songwriter/guitarist/drummer 
 Shabazz Palaces, progressive rap/alternative hip hop group
 Shane Tutmarc, indie pop singer-songwriter/multi-instrumentalist 
 Sharks Keep Moving, math rock band 
 Shawn Smith, alternative rock vocalist/keyboardist 
 Shelby Earl, indie rock singer-songwriter 
 Shoplifting, punk rock band 
 Sicko, punk rock band 
 The Sight Below, ambient/techno/shoegaze/electronic band 
 Sir Mix-a-Lot, old skool hip hop/electro-funk rapper/producer 
 Sirens Sister, alternative rock band 
 Skerik, jazz saxophonics
 Skin Yard, grunge band 
 Sky Cries Mary, psychedelic rock/trance band 
 SixTwoSeven, alternative rock band 
 Sledgeback, punk rock/Oi! band 
 Slender Means, indie rock band 
 Sleze, glam metal band 
 Smoosh (now known as Chaos Chaos), indie pop/synth-pop sister duo
 SMP, industrial rock band
 Soiled Doves (formerly The Vogues), post-hardcore band 
 Sol, hip hop rapper 
 Solger, hardcore punk band 
 Soulbender, hard rock band 
 Soundgarden, grunge band 
 Source of Labor, Northwest hip hop rap group 
 Spencer Moody, garage rock vocalist 
 Spluii Numa, hardcore punk band 
 Spys4Darwin, alternative metal band
 The Squirrels, novelty pop-punk band 
 Stan Boreson, "Scandahoovian" parody music vocalist/accordionist 
 Stefanie Sargent, punk rock guitarist 
 Stephen O'Malley aka SOMA, avant-garde metal guitarist/keyboardist 
 Steve Broy aka Dr. Heathen Scum, shock rock bassist 
 Steve Turner, grunge guitarist 
 Stone Gossard, grunge guitarist 
 Sunn O))), experimental metal band 
 Sunny Day Real Estate, emo band  
 Super Deluxe, punk pop band 
 The Supersuckers, cowpunk/hard rock band 
 Surf Mesa, electronic music artist 
 Sweet 75, alternative rock band 
 Sweet Water, alternative rock/new wave band 
 SYML, indie pop singer-songwriter 
 Syncopated Taint Septet, punk jazz band
 Tacocat, pop punk band 
 Tad, grunge band 
 Taime Downe, glam metal vocalist 
 Tamara Gee, pop singer-songwriter 
 Tangerine, dream pop band 
 Tattle Tale, riot grrrl band 
 Tea Cozies, garage rock band 
 Teen Angels, grunge band 
 Telekinesis, indie rock/shoegaze band 
 The Tempers, synthpop/glam rock/art rock/dark cabaret band 
 Temple of the Dog, grunge supergroup
 THEESatisfaction, hip hop/R&B/neo-soul duo 
 These Arms Are Snakes, post-hardcore band 
 This Busy Monster, indie rock band 
 This Providence, alternative rock/punk pop/emo band 
 Thorr's Hammer, death-doom band 
 Thrones, avant-garde metal solo project of Joe Preston
 Throw Me The Statue, indie pop band 
 Thunderpussy, hard rock band 
 Tim Gemmill, jazz/post-bop/avant-garde jazz/jazz fusion/techno saxophonist/flutist/keyboardist 
 Tim Mullen, punk rock/heavy metal drummer 
 Tina Bell, grunge/punk rock singer-songwriter 
 Tiny Vipers, indie rock singer-songwriter/guitarist 
 The Tiptons Sax Quartet, jazz quartet
 TKO, glam rock/heavy metal band 
 Toe Tag, hardcore punk/thrash metal band 
 Tom Collier, jazz/classical/pop vibraphonist/percussionist 
 Total Experience Gospel Choir, gospel choir
 Trachtenburg Family Slideshow Players, anti-folk/indie rock/art pop band 
 Travis Bracht, post-grunge singer-songwriter/multi-instrumentalist 
 Treepeople, alternative rock/post-punk band 
 Trial, hardcore punk band 
 The Tripwires, power pop/pub rock band 
 Truly, grunge/psychedelic rock band 
 Tuatara, world music instrumental band 
 Tullycraft, twee pop band 
 The Turn-Ons, alternative rock band 
 Tyler Willman, post-grunge/psychedelic rock singer-songwriter/guitarist 
 The U-Men, grunge band 
 Ugly Casanova, indie rock band
 UMI, R&B singer-songwriter
 Uncle Bonsai, contemporary folk trio
 Undertow, hardcore punk band 
 Unified Theory (formerly Luma), post-grunge band 
 United State of Electronica, electronic rock band 
 Unwed Sailor, instrumental rock/ambient/post-rock band 
 Van Conner, grunge bassist
 VAST, industrial rock band 
 Vells, indie rock band 
 Vendetta Red, post-grunge/screamo band 
 Vic Meyers, jazz saxophonist/ bandleader 
 Vince Mira, country rock vocalist/guitarist 
 Visqueen, punk pop band 
 The Wakefields, alt-country band 
 Waking Hour, prog metal band 
 The Walkabouts, indie rock/alt-country band 
 Walking Papers, alternative rock band 
 Walt Wagner, lounge/pop/classical/rock and roll pianist (Canlis 1996-2016)
 War Babies, hard rock band 
 Warrel Dane, heavy metal/thrash metal vocalist 
 Waxwing, indie rock band
 Wayne Horvitz, jazz/downtown scene keyboardist & adjunct professor at the Cornish College of the Arts
 Wellwater Conspiracy, garage rock/neo-psychedelia/space rock band 
 Western State Hurricanes, indie rock band 
 Whangdoodle Entertainers, jazz/ragtime band 
 White (formerly MerKaBa), prog rock band 
 Wil Francis aka William Control, horror punk/dark wave singer-songwriter 
 Willard, grunge/sludge metal band 
 William Bolcom, contemporary classical/traditional pop/parlour/cabaret/ragtime pianist/composer
 William Control, dark wave band 
 William Goldsmith, alternative rock drummer 
 Wimps, punk rock band 
 Wizdom, Northwest hip hop MC
 Wonderful, dream pop band 
 X-15, punk rock band 
 Xperience, alternative hip hop rapper 
 Young Fresh Fellows, alternative rock band 
  Zeke, hardcore punk band 
 Zipgun, punk rock band

References

Music of Seattle
Musicians